The Temple of Yan Hui, commonly known as simply the Temple of Yan or Yan Temple, is a temple in Qufu, China, dedicated to Yan Hui (521-490 BC), the favorite disciple of Confucius.

Location and layout

The temple is located within the historic walled city of Qufu, the hometown of both Confucius and Yan Hui, in Shandong Province. The temple is just south of the northern gates of the city wall, and is few blocks to the north of the Temple of Confucius (which is located north of the city wall's southern gates).

The temple's premises are a rectangle, 254.50 m long (from the north to the south) and 109.80 m wide (from the east to the west). According to local historians, there 148 architectural and sculptural objects (halls, pavilions, gates, steles) on the temple's premises, as well as 369 valuable old trees.

Gallery

See also
Temple of Confucius, Qufu
Temple of Mencius 孟廟
Temple of Zengzi 曾廟

Notes

References
 
 

Qufu
Confucian temples in China
Major National Historical and Cultural Sites in Shandong